Dhinarathrangal (English: Days and Nights) is a 1988 Malayalam film written by Dennis Joseph, directed by Joshi and produced by S. V. Krishna Reddy and starring Mammootty, Sumalatha, and Mukesh. The score and soundtrack were composed by Shyam. The film was inspired by the Hindi film "Achanak", (1973).

Cast
Mammootty as Aravindan
Sumalatha as Dr. Savithri
Mukesh as Ajayan
Parvathy as Treesa
Siddique as Farm Labourer
Prathapachandran as Doctor 
Devan as Unni 
Karamana Janardanan Nair as Sankarath Madhava Menon 
Babu Namboothiri as Thomachan
Rohini as Ponni  
Philomina as Aravindan's Mother
Sukumari as Lakshmi 
Jose Prakash as Commissioner Unnithan 
Jagannatha Varma as Madhava Menon's Brother-in-law 
Vijayaraghavan as Sasi
Ganesh Kumar
Mohan Jose
Azeez as Minister 
Baiju as Biju 
Santha Devi as Naniyamma 
Jagannathan   
Kunchan as Hospital Attendant

Release
The film was released on 21 January 1988.

Box office
The film was not a commercial and critical success.

Songs 
There is only one song in the film, "Thirunellikkadu Poothu". It was written by Shibu Chakravarthy, composed by Ouseppachan and sung by M. G. Sreekumar and K. S. Chithra. The song features Mukesh and Parvathy.

References

External links
 

1980s Malayalam-language films
1988 films
Films scored by Ouseppachan
Films directed by Joshiy